Balbi (or Balbis or Balby) may refer to:

Geographical features 
 Mount Balbi

Streets and palaces 
 Via Balbi (Genoa), part of the UNESCO World Heritage Site Le Strade Nuove and the system of the Palazzi dei Rolli in Genoa, Italy
 Villa Balbi Durazzo Gropallo dello Zerbino, villa in Genoa, Italy
 Palazzo Reale or Palazzo Stefano Balbi, Genoa
 Palazzo Balbi, Venice, Italy

People 
 Giovanni (or John) Balbi (or Johannes Januensis de Balbis) (died ≈1298), Italian lexicographer. In 1460 he wrote "Catholicon" a comprehensive Latin dictionary.
 Francisco Balbi di Correggio (1505-1589), Italian arquebusier. He was born in the town of Correggio in the modern Italian province of Emilia-Romagna. Francisco was a poet and historian who wrote in Italian and Spanish. He served in the military and fought in the Siege of Malta in 1565. He wrote the only first hand history of that famous battle. His experience in battle and other events during his military career were published in his memoir "The Siege of Malta 1565".   
 Ludovico Balbi (1545-1604), Venetian singer-composer and friar. Singer at St. Marco, Venice from 1570 to 1578.  Throughout his life, Balbi was appointed maestro di cappella of St. Maria Gloriosa del Frari, of the Cappella Antoniana in Padua and the Treviso Cathedral. Received an honorary degree as maestro dell'ordine, denoting particular skill exercised over a long period.
 Luigi Balbi, Venetian composer, organist, singer and friar. Nephew of Ludovico Balbi. Sang in the choir of St. Marco in Venice and later the Cappella del Santo at the basilica of St. Antonio, Padua. Appointed maestro di cappella at the Church of the Carit in Venice.
 Bartolomeo Balbi (1542–1593): Genoese consul in Antwerp, married to Lucrezia Santvoort. He died in Antwerp, and is buried in St-James.
 Lorenzo Balbi (1680–1740), Italian composer
 Ignacio Balbi (1720–1775), An 18th-century composer who performed primarily in Milan.
 Giovanni Battista Balbis (1765-1831), French(?) teacher of Antoine Risso. Balbis was a 17th-century choreographer, dancer, and stage designer. He was involved with Venetian opera from its inception and played an important role in the introduction of Venetian opera to northern Europe.
 Adrian Balbi (1782–1848), Italian geographer
 Domenico Balbi (1927–2005), a painter, designer and engraver born in Genoa in 1927. His art exhibitions won awards in Italy and abroad. He created the well known Balbi Tarot cards and gave numerous conferences about the symbolism of Tarot. He also published articles on metaphysical and philosophical topics. 
 Raul Balbi, Argentine world boxing champion

Business 
 Balbi an Argentine department store chain

See also
 Balby

Italian-language surnames